This is a list of public holidays in South Georgia and the South Sandwich Islands.

References

Lists of public holidays by country
South Georgia and the South Sandwich Islands culture
South Georgia and the South Sandwich Islands